Paprika is a 1933 Italian "white-telephones" comedy film directed by Carl Boese and starring Vittorio De Sica. A German-language version Paprika and a French version Paprika were also made.

Cast
 Renato Cialente as Paolo
 Vittorio De Sica
 Gianfranco Giachetti as Urbano
 Eva Magni as Lida Bonelli
 Elsa Merlini as Ilonka
 Sergio Tofano as Checco
 Enrico Viarisio as Massimo Bonelli

See also
 Italian films of 1933

References

External links

1933 films
1933 comedy films
1933 multilingual films
Italian comedy films
1930s Italian-language films
Italian black-and-white films
Films directed by Carl Boese
Italian multilingual films
1930s Italian films